The 2017–18 Tercera División season is the fourth-tier football league of Mexico. The tournament began on 1 September 2017 and finished on 10 June 2018.

Competition format 
The Tercera División (Third Division) is divided into 13 groups. For the 2009/2010 season, the format of the tournament has been reorganized to a home and away format, which all teams will play in their respective group. The 13 groups consist of teams who are eligible to play in the liguilla de ascenso for one promotion spot, teams who are affiliated with teams in the Liga MX, Ascenso MX and Liga Premier, which are not eligible for promotion but will play that who the better filial team in an eight team filial playoff tournament for the entire season.

The league format allows participating franchises to rent their place to another team, so some clubs compete with a different name than the one registered with the FMF.

Group 1
Group with 14 teams from Campeche, Chiapas, Quintana Roo, Tabasco and Yucatán.

Teams

League table

Group 2
Group with 18 teams from Hidalgo, Puebla, San Luis Potosí, Tlaxcala and Veracruz.

Teams

League table

Group 3
Group with 16 teams from Chiapas, Oaxaca and Veracruz.

Teams

League table

Group 4
Group with 18 teams from Greater Mexico City.

Teams

League table

Group 5
Group with 17 teams from Mexico City and State of Mexico.

Teams

League table

Group 6
Group with 8 teams from Guerrero and Morelos.

Teams

League table

Group 7
Group with 16 teams from Hidalgo, Mexico City and Puebla.

Teams

League table

Group 8
Group with 19 teams from Guanajuato, Guerrero, Michoacán and Querétaro. San Juan del Río retired after the Week 19.

Teams

League table

Group 9
Group with 20 teams from Aguascalientes, Guanajuato, Jalisco, San Luis Potosí and Zacatecas.

Teams

League table

Group 10
Group with 20 teams from Colima and Jalisco. Nuevos Valores de Ocotlán have dissolved in December 2017.

Teams

League table

Group 11
Group with 18 teams from Jalisco, Nayarit and Sinaloa.

Teams

League table

Group 12
Group with 18 teams from Coahuila, Nuevo León and Tamaulipas. Cinco Estrellas was dissafilliated in December 2017.

Teams

League table

Group 13
Group with 13 teams from Chihuahua, Coahuila, Durango and Sonora.

Teams

League table

Promotion playoffs 
The Promotion Playoffs consisted of seven phases. Classify 64 teams, the number varies according to the number of teams in each group, being between three and six clubs per sector. The country will be divided into two zones: South Zone (Groups I to VII) and North Zone (Groups VIII to XIII). Eliminations were held according to the average obtained by each group, being ordered from best to worst by their percentage throughout the season.

First round

South zone

North zone

Second round

South zone

North zone

Third round

South zone

First leg

Second leg

North zone

First leg

Second leg

Fourth round

South zone

First leg

Second leg

North zone

First leg

Second leg

Championship round

Quarter-finals

First leg

Second leg

Semi-final

First leg

Second leg

Final

First leg

Second leg

Reserve Teams

Table 

Last updated: April 21, 2018 Source: Liga TDPP = Position; G = Games played; Pts = Points; Pts/G = Ratio of points to games played; GD = Goal difference

Playoffs

Quarter-finals

First leg

Second leg

Semi-finals

First leg

Second leg

Final

First leg

Second leg

Regular Season statistics

Top goalscorers 
Players sorted first by goals scored, then by last name.

Last updated on April 21, 2018.Source: LigaTDP

See also 
Tercera División de México

References

External links 
 Official website of Liga TDP

Mx
1